CKW may refer to:

Places
 Graeme Rowley Aerodrome (IATA airport code: CKW), Pilbara, Western Australia, Australia
 Choa Chu Kang West station (station code: CKW), on the Jurong Region MRT line, at Choa Chu Kang, Singapore; see List of Singapore MRT stations
 Calderdale, Kirklees, Wakefield; a service region of Yorkshire Ambulance Service

Business
 Centralschweizerische Kraftwerke (CKW), a Swiss energy company, and division of Axpo Holding
 community knowledge workers in the agricultural value chain
 creative knowledge work for knowledge workers

Other uses
 Kaqchikel language (ISO 639 language code: ckw)
 Coffman-Kundu-Wootters inequality, which characterizes monogamy of entanglement in quantum physics

See also

 CKW3
 CKW5
 CKW6
 CKW7
 CKW8
 
 CKWS (disambiguation)